Square Lake may refer to:

Square Lake (Nova Scotia), a lake in Nova Scotia, Canada
Square Lake (Tehama County, California), a lake in California
Square Lake (Maine), in the Fish River chain of lakes
Square Lake, Maine, an unorganized territory in Maine
Square Lake (Washington County, Minnesota)